An Accidental Cowboy is a memoir by Jameson Parker. It tells the story of the former Simon and Simon actor's physical recovery and psychological healing on a California ranch.

After being shot by a neighbor in 1992, Parker and his wife Darlene moved to the California hills to run a horse and cattle ranch. The book is notable for focusing more on life changes stemming from his tragedy than from the shooting itself, describing the Hollywood actor's transition to competent cowboy.

Editions 
 An Accidental Cowboy,  Thomas Dunne Books,

Notes

2003 non-fiction books
American memoirs
Thomas Dunne Books books